The following is a list of federal subjects of Russia by incidence of substance abuse (cases per 100,000 inhabitants):

Drug abuse

Alcoholism

See also
 Healthcare in Russia
 Alcoholism in Russia
 Drug trafficking in Russia

References
 Incidence of newly diagnosed cases per 100,000 inhabitants, alcoholism and drug abuse State Committee for Statistics

Alcohol in Russia
Drugs in Russia
Federal subjects of Russia
Health in Russia
Alcohol abuse in Russia
Substance abuse